Eukaryotic translation initiation factor 1b is a protein that in humans is encoded by the EIF1B gene.

References

Further reading

External links